Six Pack is a collection of seven-inch singles released by English rock group the Police in 1980.

The pack, which came in a PVC folder contained the first five A&M singles by the band, namely "Roxanne", "Can't Stand Losing You", "So Lonely", "Message in a Bottle" and "Walking on the Moon", plus a mono version of "The Bed's Too Big Without You", which was previously unreleased. This latter song was chosen for promotional purposes for TV and radio airplay, and often regarded as the group's latest single upon release of the set.

The records in the pack were all produced on blue vinyl in picture covers with specially adapted labels which featured an overhead picture of the heads of the band (originally used on the back cover of the Reggatta de Blanc LP), rather than the original "A&M" logo. Each single was also accompanied by a special picture card (3 group shots and 3 solo shots), with the lyrics of each single printed on the reverse.

The release reached number 17 in the UK Singles Chart in June 1980. Due to changes in chart rules, this set would have been classified as an album after 1983, when Gallup took over compilation of the chart and a Michael Jackson singles pack became the first set of 7-inch singles to chart as an album.

Track listing

Credits
Sting – Lead vocals, bass
Andy Summers – Guitar, backing vocals, piano and spoken introduction on "Dead End Job"
Stewart Copeland – Drums, percussions, backing vocals

References

The Police compilation albums
1980 compilation albums
A&M Records compilation albums
Albums produced by Nigel Gray